Stari Jankovci is a village and a municipality in Vukovar-Syrmia County, Croatia

The village is located to the northeast of the Vinkovci-Tovarnik-Šid main railway route. The village is connected with the rest of the country by the D46 state road connecting it with the town of Vinkovci and continuing into Serbia as the State Road 120 to the nearest town of Šid.

Population

The population is distributed in the following settlements:
 Novi Jankovci, population 934
 Orolik, population 512
 Slakovci, population 958
 Srijemske Laze, population 572
 Stari Jankovci, population 1,429

The total municipality population was 5,216 in 2001, with 69.50% Croats, 23.24% Serbs and 5.06% Hungarians.

History

During the Croatian War of Independence, the village was occupied by the rebel Serbs in 1991. The parish church of Blessed Virgin Mary, built in 1780 with a notable Baroque-Classical main altar, was severely damaged.

Stari Jankovci is an underdeveloped municipality which is statistically classified as the First Category Area of Special State Concern by the Government of Croatia.

Name
The name Stari Jankovci means Old Jankovci, while to the southwest there is a smaller village of Novi Jankovci, meaning New Jankovci.

The name of the village in Croatian is plural.

History 
Traces of continuous human settlement at the area of the municipality are investigated at two prehistoric settlements and one necropolis, one archaeological site from antiquity and medieval necropolis "Balkan". In the area of Jankovci, there was a larger estate whose owner was the nobleman Herka around 1260, and after him duke Pavle Gorjanski. The Turks ruled the Jankovci area from 1526 to 1688. After the departure of the Turks, the Jankovci were part of the Vukovar Manor until 1945 and belonged to civilian Croatia.

Municipality government
The municipality assembly is composed of 15 representatives. As of 2009, the member parties/lists are:

See also
Jankovci railway station

References

External links 
 Jankovci Municipality
 Aerial view of the village on the Stari Jankovci Municipality You-Tube Page

Municipalities of Croatia
Populated places in Syrmia
Populated places in Vukovar-Syrmia County